Marcelo Alejandro Miranda Díaz (born 29 January 1967) is a Chilean football manager and former footballer.

Club career
Miranda played for Malleco Unido at the Segunda División and Deportes Concepción with the Argentine-Chilean Fernando Cavalleri as manager. With the same manager, he joined Cobreloa in 1992 and played for the club for nine years, winning the 1992 Primera División de Chile.

International career
He played in 15 matches for the Chile national football team from 1991 to 1997. He was also part of Chile's squad for the 1997 Copa América tournament.

Managerial career
In 2006, he began his managerial career in Hossana, a club of the evangelical community, in the Chilean Tercera División. Later, he managed several clubs at the Tercera División and Primera B such as Lota Schwager and Deportes Copiapó.

Honours
Cobreloa
 Primera División (1): 1992

References

External links
 
 
 Marcelo Miranda at PlayMakerStats

1967 births
Living people
Footballers from Santiago
Chilean footballers
Chile international footballers
Universidad de Chile footballers
Malleco Unido footballers
Deportes Concepción (Chile) footballers
Cobreloa footballers
Colo-Colo footballers
Primera B de Chile players
Chilean Primera División players
Association football defenders
Chilean football managers
Lota Schwager managers
Deportes Copiapó managers
Primera B de Chile managers